Horace Welcome Babcock (September 13, 1912 – August 29, 2003) was an American astronomer.  He was the son of Harold D. Babcock.

Career
Babcock invented and built a number of astronomical instruments, and in 1953 was the first to propose the idea of adaptive optics.  He specialized in spectroscopy and the study of magnetic fields of stars. He proposed the Babcock Model, a theory for the magnetism of sunspots.

During World War II, he was engaged in radiation work at MIT and Caltech. After the war he began a productive collaboration with his father.  His undergraduate studies were at Caltech and his doctorate from University of California, Berkeley.

Babcock's doctoral thesis contained one of the earliest indications of dark matter. He reported measurements of the rotation curve for Andromeda which suggested that the mass-to-luminosity ratio increases radially. He, however, attributed it to either absorption of light within the galaxy or modified dynamics in the outer portions of the spiral and not to any form of missing matter.

He was director of the Palomar Observatory for Caltech from 1964 to 1978.

Honors
Awards
Henry Draper Medal of the National Academy of Sciences (1957)
Eddington Medal (1958)
Fellow of the American Academy of Arts and Sciences (1959)
Bruce Medal (1969)
Gold Medal of the Royal Astronomical Society (1970)
George Ellery Hale Prize of the American Astronomical Society Solar Physics Division (1992)
Named after him
Asteroid 3167 Babcock (jointly with his father)
Babcock crater on the Moon is named only for his father
Honors

 Elected to the United States National Academy of Sciences (1954)
 Elected to the American Academy of Arts and Sciences (1959)
 Elected to the American Philosophical Society (1966)

References

External links
 Bruce Medal page
 Awarding of Bruce Medal
 Awarding of RAS gold medal
 H.W. Babcock, "The Possibility of Compensating Astronomical Seeing", PASP 65 (1953) 229
 Oral History interview transcript with Horace Babcock on 9 June 1975, American Institute of Physics, Niels Bohr Library and Archives. Interview conducted by Spencer Weart.
 Oral History interview transcript with Horace Babcock on 25 July 1977, American Institute of Physics, Niels Bohr Library and Archives. Interview conducted by Spencer Weart.
National Academy of Sciences Biographical Memoir

Obituaries
 PASP 116 (2004) 290 (not available online yet, see )
 

Scientists from California
1912 births
2003 deaths
California Institute of Technology faculty
Recipients of the Gold Medal of the Royal Astronomical Society
Fellows of the American Academy of Arts and Sciences
California Institute of Technology alumni
University of California, Berkeley alumni
20th-century American astronomers
Members of the American Philosophical Society